Sarah Jacob Cohen (September 4, 1922 – August 30, 2019) was the oldest living member of Kochi’s Jewish community, visited by The British royal family at Mattancherry, Kochi in November 2013. She was a prominent member of the Jewish Community that arrived in Mattancherry, Kochi, in the south Indian state of Kerala, over 500 years ago, from Europe, who was dedicated to keeping alive simple Jewish traditions like the humble kippah making in a far flung Jewish outpost. Cohen had a number of relatives living in Sydney, Australia, including her brother Julian Cohen.
She died on August 30, 2019 at the age of 96.

References

Cochin Jews
People from Mattancherry
1922 births
2019 deaths
Malayali people
Women from Kerala